This is a list of notable events relating to the environment in 2015. They relate to environmental law, conservation, environmentalism and environmental issues.

Events
The eight Millennium Development Goals, agreed to in 2001 by all 193 United Nations member states and at least 23 international organizations, are set to be achieved.

See also

Human impact on the environment
List of environmental issues